Elton Ray Hutchison (September 16, 1932 – March 30, 2014), was an American attorney in Dallas, Texas, who served as a Republican in the Texas House of Representatives from District 33-Q in Dallas County from 1973 to 1977 and as the chairman of the Texas Republican Party from 1976 to 1977. He was the second husband of Republican former U.S. Senator Kay Bailey Hutchison of Texas.

In 1957, Hutchison graduated with honors from Southern Methodist University in University Park, Texas. In 1959, he obtained his Juris Doctor degree, cum laude, from the same institution.

Hutchison was senior counsel with the law firm Bracewell & Giuliani. His principal area of practice was public finance.

The 1978 gubernatorial primary
In 1976, Hutchison became chairman of the Texas Republican Party, but he left the nonsalaried position in 1977 to pursue his gubernatorial campaign. In the spring of 1978, he lost his party's nomination to Bill Clements, an industrialist also from Dallas, by a lopsided vote of 115,345, 72.8 percent to 38,268, 24.2 percent. Another 4,790 votes or 3 percent went to Charles Thompson. Clements went on to win narrowly the general election by defeating the Democrat John Luke Hill and hence became the first Republican governor of Texas since Reconstruction.

Personal life
Hutchison met his wife, then known as Kay Bailey, when both were state legislators, he from Dallas and she from Houston. Hutchison resided with his wife in Dallas. They adopted two infant children in 2001, a son and a daughter. Both Hutchisons had been previously married. Ray Hutchison has grown children from his first marriage. The couple also owned a home in Nacogdoches, Texas. Hutchison died on March 30, 2014, in Dallas.

References

1932 births
2014 deaths
Southern Methodist University alumni
Republican Party members of the Texas House of Representatives
Texas Republican state chairmen
American financial businesspeople
Businesspeople from Texas
People from Dallas
Texas lawyers
Spouses of Texas politicians
American military personnel of the Korean War
United States Navy sailors
20th-century American businesspeople
20th-century American lawyers